Jügderdemidiin Gürragchaa (born 5 December 1947) is a Mongolian cosmonaut and military leader. He was the first Mongolian and second Asian to go into space. He also was Mongolia's Defense Minister from 2000 to 2004.

Early life and spaceflight

Born in Gurvanbulag, Bulgan, Gürragchaa studied in Ulaanbaatar to become an aerospace engineer. In 1966, he joined the Mongolian Air Force. He graduated from the Zhukovsky Air Force Engineering Academy in 1978.

He was selected as part of the eighth Intercosmos program on 1 March 1978, at time he was in the rank of Major General. His backup was Maidarjavyn Ganzorig. Gürragchaa, along with Soviet cosmonaut Vladimir Dzhanibekov, departed from Baikonur Cosmodrome on 22 March 1981. They docked with Salyut 6.

While in orbit, Dzhanibekov and Gürragchaa carried out experiments on Earth science. After 124 orbits and 7 days, 20 hours and 42 minutes in space, Gürragchaa and Dzhanibekov landed 170 km southeast of Dzhezkasgan.

Post-flight career
 
The Zaisan Memorial, a monument south of Ulaanbaatar dedicated to Russian–Mongolian friendship, includes a mural which depicts amongst its scenes Gürragchaa's 1981 flight.

Gürragchaa worked as the chief of staff of air defense for the Mongolian Armed Forces, served as the Defense Minister of Mongolia from 2000 to 2004 and was a member of State Great Khural from 2004 to 2008.

Personal life
Gürragchaa is married and has two children. He heads the fund for development of bandy in Mongolia. Aside from Mongolian, Gürragchaa is fluent in Russian due to his time in Russia.

Awards 
  Hero of the Soviet Union (30 March 1981) 
 Order of Lenin
 Hero of the Mongolian People's Republic (1981)
  Order of Sukhbaatar (1981)
  Order of Genghis Khan (2021)
  Order of Alexander Nevsky (2021)
  Order of Honour (2011)
  Order of Friendship (2001)
  Medal "For Merit in Space Exploration" (2011)

References

External links
 Spacefacts biography of Jügderdemidiin Gurragchaa
 Photo of the Gurragcha panel of the Zaisan Memorial

1947 births
Living people
Mongolian cosmonauts
Recipients of the Order of Alexander Nevsky
Recipients of the Order of Lenin
Foreign Heroes of the Soviet Union
Recipients of the Medal "For Merit in Space Exploration"
Recipients of the Order of Honour (Russia)
Ministers of Defence of Mongolia
Members of the State Great Khural
Bandy executives
People from Bulgan Province
Astronaut-politicians
Salyut program cosmonauts